Günther Schwarberg (14 October 1926 – 3 December 2008) was a German journalist and author whose 1979 series of articles in German news magazine  and subsequent book The SS Doctor and the Children brought the World War II-era war crimes committed in Neuengamme concentration camp and Bullenhuser Damm School in Hamburg to the public's conscience in Germany, and the rest of the world.

Bibliography
 . Hamburg: Staatliche Landesbildstelle Hamburg/Museumspädagogischer Dienst Hamburg, 1983. 
 The Murders at Bullenhuser Damm: The SS Doctor and the Children (English version) Göttingen, 1988 
  (Attack on the Cap Arcona) (1998) 
  (The Jeweler of Majdanek) (1981) 
  (The Last Day of Oradour), Göttingen 1992 
  (The Killers Laundry) Steidl (January 1990) 
  (My Twenty Children), Göttingen 1996 
  (The Last Voyage of the Exodus), Göttingen 1988 
 In the Ghetto of Warsaw (English) 2 March 2001 
  (There Once Was a Magic Mountain) Steidl (January 2001) (English version) 
  (Summer with Bertolt Brecht) 
 (Fritz Löhner-Beda) Yours is My Heart (2000) 
  (I'll never forget), Göttingen 2007 

As coauthor
 At Home and in the World'', Societe des Expositions du Palais des Beaux-Arts de Bruxelles (February 2, 2001)

Filmography
 Das Tribunal – Mord am Bullenhuser Damm

References

1926 births
2008 deaths
German male journalists
German male writers
Stern (magazine) people
20th-century German journalists